Khusain (Xösäyen) is a rural locality (a village) in Karmyshevsky Selsoviet, Alsheyevsky District, Bashkortostan, Russia. The population was 8 as of 2010. There is 1 street.

Geography 
Khusain is located 12 km south of Rayevsky (the district's administrative centre) by road. Slak is the nearest rural locality.

References 

Rural localities in Alsheyevsky District